The Lukács Thermal Bath is a historic indoor/outdoor thermal bath spa in Budapest, Hungary, heated by natural hot springs. All pools and four saunas can be used by all guests except for the optional area of the sauna world, which contains five more saunas, ice cooling pool, igloo and heated roman bench.
There are also sauna nights on Fridays from 20:00 to 02:00.

History

Thermal baths have been used at this location since at least the 12th century (by the Knights Hospitallers), and as part of the interior there is a wall that is a remainder of a former Ottoman powder mill (the Császár mill) which used the hot spring water as a source of power.

The first spa hotel was completed in the 1880s, and named for Saint Luke. This spa was expanded with a drinking-water hall constructed in 1937, and in 1979 a health clinic was added.

The Császár Thermal Bath is the oldest continually operating thermal bath in Budapest, and was originally built by Szokoli Mustafa. It was redesigned in 1844 by József Hild, and is now part of the National Institute of Rheumatology and Physiotherapy.

Facilities

Thermal section
A dry sauna and a steam room
Massage

The hot spring water is rich in calcium hyrodgencarbonate, calcium hydrogensulfite,  and magnesium hydrogencarbonate and magnesium hydrogensulphate; chloride; and also contain sodium and a substantial content of fluoride ions.

Swimming section

Wellness section
Leisure pool with  temperature (mixed with thermal and normal water)
Finnish sauna and herbal sauna
Kneipp pool
Salt wall (decoration)
Cooling pool
Rental and inner cassa
Canteen
Lounge
Gymnastic pool
Weight treatment (doctor receipt)
Mud treatment (doctor receipt)
Massage

Sauna world
In this section, people are to wear sauna sheets instead of their swimwear.
Finnish (program) sauna
Steam room
Nudist sauna
Infra sauna
Salt sauna
Ice cooling pool
Heated roman bench
Igloo

Tub section
Private bath
Massage
Tub treatments (doctor receipt)

Gallery
Exhibition of paintings and photography

Event room

Hospital
At floor number 2, there is a hospital for customised treatments.

References

External links

Lukács Thermal Bath

Thermal baths in Budapest
Landmarks in Hungary
Neoclassical architecture in Hungary